John Trengove (born March 21, 1978) is a South African film director, known for The Wound (2017) and Manodrome (2023).

Early life 
John Trengove was born in Johannesburg in 1978. Trengove is the son of famous South African advocate, Wim Trengove. He attended New York University's Tisch School of the Arts.

Career 
In 2010 he directed the miniseries Hopeville, which was nominated for an international Emmy and received the prestigious Rose d'Or for drama. It was also released as a 92-minute feature film. 

His short film, The Goat, premiered at the Berlinale Film festival in 2014 and screened at over 40 film festivals worldwide. 

In 2017, The Wound was releases, which is a controversial film which tracks a closeted relationship between two men in the context of the Xhosa initiation ritual. The film premiered at the Sundance film festival, and won best feature at Frameline, Sarasota, Valencia and Taipei Film Festivals. 

In 2023, he directed Manodrome, which has been labeled as a serious movie that may not appeal to everyone.

Trengove occasionally directs theatre, including the cult hit, The Epicene Butcher (and Other Stories for Consenting Adults).

Filmography

Feature films

TV
 Hard Copy (3 episodes)
The Lab (8 episodes)
Bag of Plenty (12 episodes)
Shuga (2 episodes)

Controversies

TLVFest
Trengove was scheduled to speak at TLVFest in Tel Aviv in 2017. His film The Wound opened the festival program. Several days prior to opening he pulled out of the festival, cancelling his speech, citing his identification with the cultural boycott of Israel. Despite Trengove's cancellation and request that the film not be shown, TLVFest proceeded with the film screening as planned. It was also reported, that Trengove cancelled his attendance while already being in Israel as a guest of TLVFest with his expenses already paid by organizers.

References

External links
 

1978 births
South African film directors
Living people